Megapsyrassa linsleyi is a species of beetle in the family Cerambycidae. It was described by Chemsak and Giesbert in 1986.

References

Elaphidiini
Beetles described in 1986